Sani Rifati is a human rights activist and the President of Voice of Roma. A native Roma himself, he was born in Pristina, Yugoslavia (in present-day Kosovo), lived and worked in California, United States. He currently resides in Berlin, Germany.

Rifati began dancing as a youth in Pristina and was a part of the 'Kheljen Romalen!' Folklore Dance Ensemble. During the 1980s, he was a drummer for a professional band. He has worked as Romani dance instructor and choreographer. Since 2012 he has worked as a Roma-dance teacher at the refugee dance group Heimatsterne of the Arbeitsgruppe Flucht+Menschenrechte in Berlin.

Rifati is a cousin of the Macedonian Gypsy vocalist and dancer Esma Redzhepova as well as being her tour manager. He has also managed Ivo Papasov, Yuri Yunakov, and Kal.

He appeared on the History Channels programme Curse on the Gypsies.

Notes

References

External links

American human rights activists
American Romani people
American people of Romani descent
Yugoslav emigrants to the United States
Yugoslav Romani people
Kosovan Romani people
Romani dancers
Serbian human rights activists
Serbian Romani people
People from Pristina
Living people
1962 births